Alok Chandra Sahoo (born 5 November 1989) is an Indian first-class cricketer who plays for Odisha.

References

External links
 

1989 births
Living people
Indian cricketers
Odisha cricketers
People from Cuttack
Cricketers from Odisha